Ambassador is the highest ranking diplomat who represents a nation.

Ambassador may also refer to:

Representatives
Diplomatic:
 Ambassador-at-large
Extraordinary ambassador
Ordinary ambassador
Commercial:
 Brand ambassador
Facebook ambassador
Student:
People to People Student Ambassador Program
Student ambassador
 Goodwill ambassador
 Wikipedia:Embassy

Art and entertainment

Film, television and theatre 
 The Ambassador (1936 film), an Italian historical comedy film
 The Ambassador (1960 film), a West German film
 The Ambassador (1984 American film), a political thriller based on Elmore Leonard's novel 52 Pick-Up
 The Ambassador (1984 Croatian film), a film directed by Fadil Hadžić
 The Ambassador (2005 film), a Norwegian documentary film directed by Erling Borgen
 The Ambassador (2011 film), a Danish documentary film
 Ambassadors (TV series), a 2013 British comedy drama television series
 The Ambassador (TV series), a 1998–1999 British drama
 Ambassador (musical), a 1971 adaptation of the Henry James novel (see below)

Literature and painting
 Ambassador (novel), a 2015 science fiction book by William Alexander
 The Ambassadors, a 1903 novel by Henry James
 The Ambassadors (Holbein), a 1533 painting by Hans Holbein the Younger
 The Ambassador (comic strip), a comic strip by Otto Soglow
 The Ambassador (magazine) (formerly International Textiles), a British export magazine for textiles and fashion
 The Ambassador (West novel), a 1965 novel by Australian writer Morris West
 The Ambassador, a 1991 novel by Ioan Mihai Cochinescu

Music 
 Ambassador (album), a 2005 album by Elliott Brood
 The Ambassador (rapper), Christian rapper
 The Saints (British band) or The Ambassadors, an English pop group
 DJ Misjah (born 1971), Dutch DJ who also performs under the name "AMbassador"
 X Ambassadors, an American alternative rock band

Places 
 Ambassador Auditorium, Pasadena, California
 Ambassador Bridge, between Detroit, Michigan and Windsor, Ontario
 Ambassador College (defunct), Pasadena, California
 The Ambassador (Indianapolis, Indiana), a historic apartment building
 Ambassador Hotel (disambiguation)
 Ambassador Theatre (disambiguation)

Transport

Automobiles 
 AMC Ambassador, the top-of-the-line models produced by American Motors Corporation (AMC) from 1958 until 1974
 Austin Ambassador, a hatchback car model marketed by British Leyland from 1982 to 1984
 Nash Ambassador, the model name applied to the senior line of Nash automobiles from 1932 until 1957
 Hindustan Ambassador, a car manufactured by Hindustan Motors of India from 1958 until 2014
 Yellow Cab Ambassador, vehicles sold for use as taxis from 1921 until 1925
 Ambassador (automobile company), an automobile company of Chicago, Illinois

Trains 
 Ambassador (B&O train), operated by the Baltimore & Ohio Railroad between Baltimore and Detroit
 Ambassador (B&M train), operated by the Boston & Maine Railroad between New York/Boston and Montreal

Other uses intransport
 Ambassador (clipper), a 1869 British tea clipper, one of the last composite ships
 Ambassador (motorcycles), made by a British manufacturer
 Airspeed Ambassador, a British airliner
 Berkhof Ambassador, a Dutch bus from the company Berkhof
 HMS Ambassador, a Second World War minesweeper

Other uses 
 BT Ambassador, a telephone switchboard PBX
 The Ambassador, winner of the 1942 Hambletonian Stakes

See also 
 Ambassadeur, a Swedish fishing reel
 Les Ambassadeurs (disambiguation)